Philip O'Doherty (1871 – 6 February 1926) was an Irish nationalist politician and Member of Parliament (MP) in the House of Commons of the United Kingdom of Great Britain and Ireland.

He was first elected unopposed as the Irish Parliamentary Party MP for the North Donegal constituency at the 1906 general election. He was re-elected unopposed at the January 1910 and December 1910 general elections. He lost his seat at the 1918 general election.

External links

1871 births
1926 deaths
Irish Parliamentary Party MPs
Members of the Parliament of the United Kingdom for County Donegal constituencies (1801–1922)
UK MPs 1906–1910
UK MPs 1910
UK MPs 1910–1918
People from County Donegal